Robert Anderton (c. 1560 – 25 April 1586) was an English Roman Catholic priest and martyr. Along with his companion, William Marsden, they were beatified by the Roman Catholic Church with a feast day every 25 April.

Biographies
Robert Anderton was born in Lancashire around 1560. He probably attended Brasenose College and graduated from Oxford University in 1578. While at Reims, Anderton was regarded as an excellent preacher, and a gifted teacher. He was ordained 31 March 1585.

William Marsden was also born in Lancashire, and probably attended St Mary Hall, Oxford. Anderton and Marsden were friends from early youth and attended Oxford together, although at different colleges. The two travelled to Douai, where they converted to Roman Catholicism. They entered the English College at Reims in 1580. The two were ordained to the priesthood there, and made prefects over the junior school.

Mission, capture, and execution
Upon finishing their studies, Anderton and Marsden set out for England on 4 February 1586. They were caught in a storm while crossing the English Channel and prayed to die on land rather than at sea. Their ship being driven ashore by the storm onto the Isle of Wight, they were quickly seized by the local authorities. In court, they pleaded that they had not violated the law by landing in England, as their landing was involuntary, being forced ashore by the storm.

This led to their being summoned to London, where they were given the opportunity to take the Oath of Supremacy, acknowledging Elizabeth as the Supreme Governor of the Church of England. Although they acknowledged Elizabeth as their lawful queen in all secular affairs, they would not swear the Oath. As failure to take the oath was considered treason under the Second Act of Supremacy, Anderton and Marsden were found guilty of treason. The sentence was then confirmed, and a proclamation was published, explaining their guilt. They were taken back to the Isle of Wight near the spot where they had landed and executed by hanging, drawing, and quartering on 25 April 1586.  

The actual spot has not been identified. Some say it is at Mark's Corner on the edge of Parkhurst Forest, others that it could be in Gurnard above the sailing club. Wherever it was, it overlooked Cowes Roads, where they first sought shelter from the storm.

Legacy 
They were beatified by Pope Pius XI in 1929.

There is a stained glass window of Blessed Robert Anderton in St Mary's Catholic Church in Euxton.

A memorial plaque was erected in their honor in the garden at St Thomas of Canterbury Roman Catholic Church in Cowes.

See also
 Douai Martyrs

References

External links
 Pollen SJ, John Hungerford, Acts of the English Martyrs, Chap. IV, Burns & Oates, Ltd., London, 1891

Year of birth unknown
Date of birth unknown
1586 deaths
English beatified people
Converts to Roman Catholicism
Alumni of Brasenose College, Oxford
16th-century English Roman Catholic priests
English College, Reims alumni
People executed under the Tudors for treason against England
16th-century Roman Catholic martyrs
16th-century venerated Christians
Executed people from Lancashire
People executed under Elizabeth I by hanging, drawing and quartering
Year of birth uncertain
One Hundred and Seven Martyrs of England and Wales